Muon  − 2 (pronounced "gee minus two") is a particle physics experiment at Fermilab to measure the anomalous magnetic dipole moment of a muon to a precision of 0.14 ppm, which will be a sensitive test of the Standard Model. It might also provide evidence of the existence of entirely new particles.

The muon, like its lighter sibling the electron, acts like a spinning magnet. The parameter known as the " factor" indicates how strong the magnet is and the rate of its gyration. This difference from 2 (the "anomalous" part) is caused by higher-order contributions from quantum field theory. In measuring  − 2 with high precision and comparing its value to the theoretical prediction, physicists will discover whether the experiment agrees with theory. Any deviation would point to as yet undiscovered subatomic particles that exist in nature.

Four data-taking periods (Run 1, Run 2, Run 3, and Run 4) have been completed, with Run 5 currently ongoing. The results from the analysis of the Run 1 data were announced and published on April 7, 2021. The physicists reported that results from recent studies involving the particle challenged the Standard Model and, accordingly, may require an updating of currently understood physics.

Timeline

Muon g − 2 at CERN

The first muon  − 2 experiments began at CERN in 1959 at the initiative of Leon Lederman. A group of six physicists formed the first experiment, using the Synchrocyclotron at CERN. The first results were published in 1961, with a 2% precision with respect to the theoretical value, and then the second ones with this time a 0.4% precision, hence validating the quantum electrodynamics theory.

A second experiment started in 1966 with a new group, working this time with the Proton-Synchrotron, still at CERN. The results were then 25 times more precise than the previous ones and showed a quantitative discrepancy between the experimental values and the theoretical ones, and thus required the physicists to recalculate their theoretical model.
The third experiment, which started in 1969, published its final results in 1979, confirming the theory with a precision of 0.0007%.
The United States took over the  − 2 experiment in 1984.

Muon g − 2 at Brookhaven National Laboratory
The next stage of muon  − 2 research was conducted at the Brookhaven National Laboratory Alternating Gradient Synchrotron. The experiment was done similarly to the last of the CERN experiments with the goal of having 20 times better precision. The technique involved storing 3.094 GeV muons in a uniform measured magnetic field and observing the difference of the muon spin precession and rotation frequency via detection of the muon decay electrons. The advance in precision relied crucially on a much more intense beam than was available at CERN and the injection of muons into the storage ring, whereas the previous CERN experiments had injected pions into the storage ring, of which only a small fraction decay into muons that are stored. The experiment used a much more uniform magnetic field using a superferric superconducting storage ring magnet, a passive superconducting inflector magnet, fast muon kickers to deflect the injected muons onto stored orbits, a beam tube NMR trolley that could map the magnetic field in the storage region, and numerous other experimental advances.  The experiment took data with positive and negative muons between 1997 and 2001. Its final result is  obtained by combination of consistent results with similar precision from positive and negative muons.

Muon g − 2 at Fermilab 
Fermilab is continuing the experiment conducted at Brookhaven National Laboratory to measure the anomalous magnetic dipole moment of the muon. The Brookhaven experiment ended in 2001, but ten years later Fermilab acquired the equipment, and is working to make a more accurate measurement (smaller σ) which will either eliminate the discrepancy between Brookhaven's results and theory predictions or confirm it as an experimentally observable example of physics beyond the Standard Model.

The magnet was refurbished and powered on in September 2015, and has been confirmed to have the same 1.3 ppm basic magnetic field uniformity that it had before the move.

As of October 2016 the magnet has been rebuilt and carefully shimmed to produce a highly uniform magnetic field. New efforts at Fermilab have resulted in a three-fold improved overall uniformity, which is important for the new measurement at its higher precision goal.

In April 2017 the collaboration was preparing the experiment for the first production run with protons – to calibrate detector systems. The magnet received its first beam of muons in its new location on May 31, 2017. Data taking was planned to run until 2020.

On April 7, 2021, the results of the experiment were published: . The new experimental world-average results announced by the Muon  − 2 collaboration are: -factor: , anomalous magnetic moment: . The combined results from Fermilab and Brookhaven show a difference with theory at a significance of 4.2 sigma, slightly under the 5 sigma (or standard deviations) that particle physicists require to claim a discovery, but still compelling evidence of new physics. The chance that a statistical fluctuation would produce equally striking results is about  The same day lattice QCD results by the Budapest-Marseille-Wuppertal Collaboration (BMW) collaboration were published which stood between the experimental value obtained at Fermilab and the theoretical value calculated by the Muon g-2 Theory Initiative, subsequent works by the Coordinated Lattice Simulations (CLS) group the European Twisted Mass Collaboration (ETMC) have come closer each to the theoretical value suggesting there could be systematical errors in the estimation of the R-ratio of the hadronic vacuum polarization used by Fermilab.

Theory of magnetic moments
The  factor of a charged lepton (electron, muon, or tau) is very nearly 2. The difference from 2 (the "anomalous" part) depends on the lepton, and can be computed quite precisely based on the current Standard Model of particle physics. Measurements of the electron are in excellent agreement with this computation. The Brookhaven experiment did this measurement for muons, a much more technically difficult measurement due to their short lifetime, and detected a tantalizing, but not definitive, 3.7  discrepancy between the measured value and the prediction of the Standard Model ( versus ).

Design

Central to the experiment is a -diameter superconducting magnet with an exceptionally uniform magnetic field. This was transported, in one piece, from Brookhaven in Long Island, New York, to Fermilab in the summer of 2013. The move traversed  over 35 days, mostly on a barge down the East Coast and through Mobile, Alabama, to the Tennessee–Tombigbee Waterway and then briefly on the Mississippi. The initial and final legs were on a special truck traveling closed highways at night.

Detectors
The magnetic moment measurement is realized by 24 electromagnetic calorimetric detectors, which are distributed uniformly on the inside of the storage ring. The calorimeters measure the energy and time of arrival (relative to the injection time) of the decay positrons (and their count) from the muon decay in the storage ring. After a muon decays into a positron and two neutrinos, the positron ends up with less energy than the original muon. Thus, the magnetic field curls it inward where it hits a segmented lead(II) fluoride (PbF) calorimeter read out by silicon photo-multipliers (SiPM).

The tracking detectors register the trajectory of the positrons from the muon decay in the storage ring. The tracker can provide a muon electric dipole moment measurement, but not directly the magnetic moment measurement. The main purpose of the tracker is to measure the muon beam profile, as well as resolution of pile-up of events (for reduction of the systematic uncertainty in the calorimeter measurement).

Magnetic field
To measure the magnetic moment to ppb level of precision requires a uniform average magnetic field to be of the same level precision. The experimental goal of  − 2 is to achieve an uncertainty level on the magnetic to 70 ppb averaged over time and muon distribution. Calibration of the trolley is referenced to the Larmor frequency of a proton in a spherical water sample at a reference temperature (34.7 °C), and is cross-calibrated to a novel helium-3 magnetometer.

Data acquisition
An essential component of the experiment is the data acquisition (DAQ) system, which manages the data flow from the detector electronics. The requirement for the experiment is to acquire raw data at a rate of 18 GB/s. This is accomplished by employing parallel data-processing architecture using 24 high-speed GPUs (NVIDIA Tesla K40) to process data from 12 bit waveform digitisers. The set-up is controlled by the MIDAS DAQ software framework. The DAQ system processes data from 1296 calorimeter channels, 3 straw tracker stations, and auxiliary detectors (e.g. entrance muon counters). The total data output of the experiment is estimated at 2 PB.

Collaboration
The following universities, laboratories, and companies are participating in the experiment:

Universities
Boston University
Cornell University
Johannes Gutenberg University Mainz
University of Chicago
University of Illinois at Urbana-Champaign
James Madison University
Korea Advanced Institute of Science and Technology (KAIST)
University of Kentucky
University of Liverpool
Lancaster University
University College London
University of Manchester
University of Massachusetts
Michigan State University
University of Michigan
University of Mississippi
Università del Molise
Università degli Studi di Napoli Federico II
North Central College
Northern Illinois University
Regis University
Shanghai Jiao Tong University
Technische Universitat Dresden
Università di Udine
University of Virginia
University of Washington

Laboratories
Argonne National Laboratory
Brookhaven National Laboratory
Fermi National Accelerator Laboratory
Budker Institute of Nuclear Physics
Istituto Nazionale di Fisica Nucleare
Joint Institute for Nuclear Research, Dubna
Laboratori Nazionali di Frascati
INFN, Sezione di Napoli
INFN, Sezione di Pisa
INFN, Sezione di Roma Tor Vergata
Institute for Basic Science, S. Korea

References

External links
 
 
 



Fermilab experiments
Particle experiments
Research projects